Copulabyssia riosi is a species of sea snail, a marine gastropod mollusk in the family Pseudococculinidae.

Distribution
This species occurs in the Atlantic Ocean off Brazil.

Description 
The maximum recorded shell length is 3.5 mm.

Habitat 
Minimum recorded depth is 960 m. Maximum recorded depth is 1320 m.

References

Pseudococculinidae
Gastropods described in 2000